Benjamin Ward (born 27 November 1998) is a Jersey international cricketer. 

In May 2019, he was named in Jersey's squad for the Regional Finals of the 2018–19 ICC T20 World Cup Europe Qualifier tournament in Guernsey. He made his Twenty20 International (T20I) debut in the opening match of the competition on 15 June 2019 against the host nation Guernsey.

In September 2019, he was named in Jersey's squad for the 2019 ICC T20 World Cup Qualifier tournament in the United Arab Emirates. He made his List A debut on 16 February 2020, for Boland in the 2019–20 CSA Provincial One-Day Challenge in South Africa.

In October 2021, Ward was named in Jersey's T20I squad for the Regional Final of the 2021 ICC Men's T20 World Cup Europe Qualifier tournament.

References

External links
 

1998 births
Living people
Jersey cricketers
Jersey Twenty20 International cricketers
Boland cricketers
Place of birth missing (living people)